Xing'an County is a county in the northeast of Guangxi Zhuang Autonomous Region, China. It is administered as part of the prefecture-level city of Guilin. The postal code is 541300.

Climate

Notes

References

External links
Xing'an Government website

 
Counties of Guangxi
Administrative divisions of Guilin